An antibacchius is a rare metrical foot used in formal poetry.

In accentual-syllabic verse an antibacchius consists of two accented syllables followed by one unaccented syllable.  Its opposite is a bacchius.

Example:
Blind luck is
loved more than
hard thinking.

Referenced

Metrical feet